Progress M-3 was a Soviet uncrewed cargo spacecraft which was launched in 1990 to resupply the Mir space station. The twentieth of sixty four Progress flights to visit Mir, it was a Progress-M 11F615A55 spacecraft, and had the serial number 203. It carried supplies including food, water and oxygen for the EO-6 crew aboard Mir, as well as equipment for conducting scientific research, and fuel for adjusting the station's orbit and performing manoeuvres.

Progress M-3 was launched at 23:10:57 GMT on 28 February 1990, atop a Soyuz-U2 carrier rocket flying from Site 1/5 at the Baikonur Cosmodrome. It docked with the aft port of the Kvant-1 module at 01:04:32 GMT on 3 March.

Progress M-3 undocked at 20:24:43 GMT on 27 April to make way for Progress 42. It was deorbited at 00:00:00 GMT the next day. It burned up in the atmosphere over the Pacific Ocean, with any remaining debris landing in the ocean at around 00:52 GMT.

See also

1990 in spaceflight
List of Progress flights
List of uncrewed spaceflights to Mir

References

1990 in the Soviet Union
Progress (spacecraft) missions
Spacecraft launched in 1990